Juliet Itoya (born 17 August 1986) is a Nigerian-born Spanish athlete specialising in the long jump. She won the gold medal at the 2014 Ibero-American Championships.

Her personal bests in the event are 6.79 metres outdoors (+1.4 m/s, Salamanca 2016) and 6.47 metres indoors (Madrid 2016).

International competitions

References

1986 births
Living people
Sportspeople from Benin City
Spanish female long jumpers
Spanish sportspeople of African descent
Spanish people of Nigerian descent
Sportspeople of Nigerian descent
Nigerian female long jumpers
Nigerian emigrants to Spain
Naturalised citizens of Spain
Athletes (track and field) at the 2016 Summer Olympics
Olympic athletes of Spain
Mediterranean Games silver medalists for Spain
Mediterranean Games medalists in athletics
Athletes (track and field) at the 2013 Mediterranean Games
Athletes (track and field) at the 2018 Mediterranean Games
Ibero-American Championships in Athletics winners